The United States Attorney for the Northern District of California is the United States Attorney responsible for representing the federal government in the United States District Court for the Northern District of California.

The Northern District of California encompasses 15 Northern California counties from Del Norte in the north to Monterey in the south. The District contains three major metropolitan areas in San Francisco, Oakland, and San Jose; an expanse of suburban and rural area; and more than 300 public companies centered on Silicon Valley. Nearly 9 million people live, work, and raise their families in the Northern District of California.

In an effort to help protect these individuals, the United States Attorney’s Office prosecutes violations of federal law and represents the United States in civil litigation in the District. The Assistant United States Attorneys (“AUSAs”) who work in the U.S. Attorney's Office prosecute criminal violations, defend civil lawsuits against the United States, and litigate actions to collect judgments and restitution on behalf of victims and taxpayers.

 the Acting United States Attorney is Stephanie Hinds.

The United States Attorney's Office for the Northern District of California has offices in San Francisco, Oakland, and San Jose.

Divisions 
Criminal Division: Responsible for prosecutions of federal crimes, including bank and bankruptcy fraud; consumer, elder, government, and health care fraud; child exploitation and human trafficking; civil rights; criminal immigration; cybercrimes; environmental crimes; national security; narcotics; public corruption; securities fraud; tax; trade secrets theft; and violent crimes.  Sections within the Criminal Division are:  Appellate; Asset Forfeiture; General Crimes; Corporate Fraud Strike Force; Organized Crime Drug Enforcement Task Force (OCDETF); Organized Crime Strike Force; Special Prosecutions.
Civil Division: Responsible for representing the United States in civil suits. The Civil Division includes Civil Defensive, Affirmative Civil Enforcement, and the Financial Litigation Unit.
Administrative Division: Responsible for providing a full range of office support and employee services.

Formed 
The U.S. Attorney’s Office was formed by Act of September 28, 1850, Chap. 86, P.L. 81-36, 9 Stat. 521.

Historical list of U.S. Attorneys for the Northern District of California

References

External links
Official website